Joel James may refer to:

 Joel James (basketball) (born 1994), American basketball player
 Joel James (politician), Welsh politician
 Joel James (rugby league player), English rugby league player